The Col du Galibier (el. ) is a mountain pass in the southern region of the French Dauphiné Alps near Grenoble. It is the eighth highest paved road in the Alps, and recurrently the highest point of the Tour de France.

It connects Saint-Michel-de-Maurienne and Briançon via the col du Télégraphe and the Col du Lautaret. The pass is closed during the winter. It is located between the massif d'Arvan-Villards and the massif des Cerces, taking its name from the secondary chain of mountains known as the Galibier.

Before 1976, the tunnel was the only point of passage at the top, at an altitude of 2556 m. The tunnel was closed for restoration until 2002, and a new road was constructed over the summit. The re-opened tunnel is a single lane controlled by traffic lights, which are among the highest such installations in Europe.

History
In 1876 the first passable road was opened between Maurienne and Briançon in the Oisans region. In the north the pass road begins in Valloire, only reachable via the Col du Télégraphe  which is before Galibier and connects Saint-Michel-de-Maurienne with Valloire. In the south, the road begins at a level of 2,057 m  Col du Lautaret, which connects Grenoble in the west with Briançon in the east. The highest point of this road was at an altitude of 2,658 m, 16 meters higher than nowadays. The road between Col du Lautaret is 24,5 kilometers long, 16 kilometers is the northern part, 8,5 kilometers is the south part. The road over the Galibier was first a natural road, later asphalted.

Construction and opening of tunnel

The area of the summit was a difficult passage, therefore, in 1890, a 363-meter-long tunnel was built, which was opened in 1891. This tunnel is four meters wide, allowing only for the passage of vehicles in one direction at a time.

Details of the climb 

The maximum gradient is 10.1% at the summit.

On both sides of the Col du Galibier mountain pass cycling milestones are placed every kilometre. They indicate the distance to the summit, the current altitude, and the average slope in the following kilometre.

The Tour de France 

The Col du Galibier was first used in the Tour de France in 1911; the first rider over the summit was Emile Georget, who, with Paul Duboc and Gustave Garrigou were the only riders not to walk.

The original summit was at 2556 m.; while the tunnel was closed from 1976 until 2002, the tour route went only over the pass closer to the mountain peak at 2645 m. In 2011, the Tour de France went through the tunnel for the first time during the 19th stage from Modane Valfréjus to L'Alpe d'Huez.

At the south portal of the tunnel, at the edge of the road, there is a monument to Henri Desgrange, instigator and first director of the Tour de France. The memorial was inaugurated when the tour passed on 19 July 1949. Whenever the tour crosses the Col du Galibier, a wreath is laid on the memorial. The Souvenir Henri Desgrange is awarded to the first rider across the summit of the highest mountain in each year's tour. In 2006, the prize of 5,000 euros was claimed on the Col du Galibier by Michael Rasmussen.

Since 1947, the Col de Galibier has been crossed 31 times by the Tour de France. It was scheduled to be used in 1996, but was left out at the last minute due to bad weather. As a result of snow on both the Col de l'Iseran and the Col du Galibier, the scheduled 190 km stage from Val-d'Isère to Sestriere in Italy was reduced to a 46 km sprint from Le-Monetier-les-Bains which was claimed by Bjarne Riis, resulting in him taking the yellow jersey which he retained to the finish in Paris.

In the 2008 Tour, the Col du Galibier had been crossed on 23 July in the 210 km stage 17 from Embrun to Alpe d'Huez.

The  2011 Tour climbed the Col du Galibier twice to celebrate the 100th anniversary of the first appearance of the pass in the Tour de France, including the first ever summit finish, won by Andy Schleck after a 60 km solo breakaway.  This was the highest ever stage finish in the Tour de France. It was scheduled to be used again in stage 20 of the 2015 Tour, but was left out nine days before the race start due to landslides in the Chambon Tunnel, situated towards the bottom of the descent of the climb. It was also used twice, on stages 11 and 12, of the 2022 Tour.

Appearances in the Tour de France (since 1947)

The Giro d'Italia 
The 2013 Giro d'Italia climbed the Col du Galibier, although the stage had to be shortened by 4 km due to heavy snowfall.

See also
 List of highest paved roads in Europe
 List of mountain passes
 Dauphiné Alps

References

External links 

 Complete list of leaders over summit 
A Cycling History of Galibier
Profile from Valloire on climbbybike.com
Profile from Col du Lautaret on climbbybike.com
Cycling the Col du Galibier - tips and advice
Col du Galibier cycling. Profiles and pictures 
CYCLEFILM's Video Reconnaissance of Galibier
Grenoble Cycling Col du Galibier information page including profiles and images
Video Cycling with snow
Col du Galibier on Google Maps (Tour de France classic climbs)

Mountain passes of the Alps
Climbs in cycle racing in France
Mountain passes of Provence-Alpes-Côte d'Azur
Landforms of Savoie
Landforms of Hautes-Alpes
Transport in Provence-Alpes-Côte d'Azur